Liisa Turmann (born December 3, 1990) is an Estonian curler from Järveküla, Estonia. She currently plays third on the Estonian women's curling team skipped by her sister Marie Kaldvee.

Career

Juniors
Turmann played in three European Junior Curling Challenge events during her junior career in 2010, 2011 and 2012. Her best finish came in 2012 when her team, skipped by Helen Nummert finished in fourth with a 5–3 record.

Women's
While still in juniors, Turmann competed in her first European Curling Championships in 2010 as third for Team Estonia skipped by Küllike Ustav. The team finished seventh in the B Division with a 3–6 record.

Turmann did not return to an international competition until the 2018 European Curling Championships as her team, skipped by sister Marie Turmann, won the 2018 Estonian Women's Curling Championship. The team had won the event the previous year as well, but Turmann did not participate in the 2017 European Curling Championships. At the 2018 Euros, the team finished second in the B Division. This qualified Estonia for the 2019 World Qualification Event for a chance to make it to the 2019 World Women's Curling Championship. At the Qualification event, the team could not make the playoffs, finishing with a 3–4 record. In 2019, the team won their first World Curling Tour event at the Tallinn Ladies International Challenger. A few weeks later, the team once again represented Estonia at the 2019 European Curling Championships where they got to compete in the A Division. They finished with a 2–7 record, which qualified them once again for the 2020 World Qualification Event. There, they just missed the playoffs with a 4–3 record. The team won two more national championships in 2020 and 2021.

Due the COVID-19 pandemic, the field at the 2021 World Women's Curling Championship was expanded to fourteen teams, after the 2020 World Women's Curling Championship was cancelled. The 2021 event was originally planned to be hosted by Switzerland, giving that nation an automatic entry. This gave Europe an extra qualification spot for the 2021 Worlds, which was based on the results of the 2019 European Championship, the last Euros held before the pandemic. As they had finished eighth, this qualified Estonia and the Turmann rink for the 2021 Worlds, the first time Estonia would play at the World Championships. At the World Championships, the team finished in last with a 1–12 record. Their lone win came against Germany.

Personal life
Turmann is employed as a waitress. Her sister is teammate Marie Kaldvee.

Teams

References

External links

Living people
1990 births
Estonian female curlers
Estonian curling champions
Sportspeople from Tallinn
21st-century Estonian women